Anton Kuivanen (born May 1, 1984) is an Estonian-Finnish mixed martial artist and coach. Kuivanen trains and teaches at the GB Gym, which is located in Helsinki, Finland and he has also had training camps in American Top Team located in Coconut Creek, Florida.

Background
Anton Kuivanen was born in Pärnu, Estonia. He has two brothers and their mother Valentina is Russian and their father Vladimir is Finnish and Estonian.

Kuivanen's first touch with martial arts was karate at the age of four in his native Estonia. Anton and his brothers were athletic and active since childhood, playing football and ice hockey. Towards his teenage years, he complemented his  combat training with Capoeira, boxing and wrestling before becoming interested in mixed martial arts.

Mixed martial arts career

Early career
Kuivanen started training mixed martial arts in 2004, winning all of his amateur bouts and eventually winning Finnish mixed martial arts championship in 2006. Kuivanen made his professional mixed martial arts debut in January 2006 in his native Finland. Over the next 6 years, he amassed a record of 16 wins and 4 losses.

In April 2011, he won the Cage Lightweight Championship and successfully defended it in October 2011.

Ultimate Fighting Championship
On January 16, 2012 it was announced that Kuivanen has signed a multi-fight deal with the UFC. He made his promotional debut on February 15, 2012 against fellow newcomer Justin Salas at UFC on Fuel TV 1. He lost the fight via unanimous decision.

Kuivanen fought Mitch Clarke on July 21, 2012 at UFC 149. He won the bout via split decision.

Kuivanen faced Michael Chiesa on February 23, 2013 at UFC 157. Kuivanen lost to Chiesa via rear-naked choke in the second round after doing well for the first round and defending Chiesa's attacks. He made a mistake against the cage and Chiesa - who is known for his submissions and back control - got him down and after small grappling exchange he got the choke locked and gave Anton chance to tap or go out. Despite having one bout left in his contract, he was subsequently released from the promotion with a record of 1–2.

Post-UFC career
Anton Kuivanen defended his CAGE lightweight title against Jason Pierce on May 11, 2013, winning by clear decision. His goal of getting back in the UFC took a huge step backwards when he was knocked out by Eric Reynolds in 30 seconds. The underdog landed a punch behind his ear when Kuivanen was moving in. Kuivanen lost his balance, dropped to ground and Reynolds knocked him out cold with finishing punches. Kuivanen was very sad and stated, that he had put effort to being more relaxed before and during the fight than before but it backfired and Kuivanen was too relaxed which lead into his first clean knockout loss and for his first loss in Finland since 2006. Reynolds had said after the fight that he is willing to face him in a rematch.

Kuivanen got back in the cage in November 23, 2013 when he faced Diego Gonzalez in Sweden. Kuivanen needed only 52 seconds to knock Gonzalez out. Likewise, this was his first clean knockout win. He dropped Gonzalez and he looked at the referee. When the referee let the fight go on, Kuivanen put Diego out with few more punches to get the win. He will fight some weeks after this fight in a catchweight bout. He will face Oriol Gaset in Salo, Finland.
If he wins his fight against Gaset he will possibly face Reynolds in a rematch for the title and/or face former UFC fighter Reza Madadi, who called Kuivanen out after Kuivanen's fight.

On July 1, 2018, Kuivanen faced the then-reigning lightweight King of Pancrase Takasuke Kume in a non-title bout at Pancrase: 297. Kuivanen won the fight via technical knockout.

Next Kuivanen faced Valeriu Mircea at Cage 44 on September 8, 2018. Kuivanen lost the fight via technical knockout in the second round.

Kuivanen was then expected to face Takasuke Kume in a rematch, which would have been for the Pancrase Lightweight Championship, at Pancrase 304 on April 14, 2019. However, Kuivanen withdrew from the bout due to a knee injury which needed surgery and was replaced by Tom Santos.

After a year of rehabilitating the knee, Kuivanen faced Dan Moret at UAE Warriors 9 on November 29, 2019. He lost the fight via knockout in the second round.

Almost two years removed from his previous bout, Kuivanen is now expected to face Artur Sowiński for the vacant EFM Lightweight Championship at EFM 2 on September 11, 2021.

Coaching career
Having graduated as a certified sports coach from Pajulahti Sports Institute, Kuivanen has been coaching at Crest Professional Fighting Center since 2006.

On July 1, 2020, Kuivanen was appointed as the head coach of Primus Fight Team, the team he has trained in since the beginning of his mixed martial arts career.

Personal life
Kuivanen and his wife have a daughter, Vilma (born 2018) and a son (born 2022).

Championships and accomplishments
Cage MMA
Cage Lightweight Championship (Two time; Current)
Nordic MMA Awards - MMAviking.com
2013 Knockout of the Year vs. Diego Gonzalez

Mixed martial arts record

|-
|Loss
|align=center|26–13
|Artur Sowiński
|Decision (majority)
|EFM Show 2: Polska vs. Bułgaria
|
|align=center|5
|align=center|5:00
|Sofia, Bulgaria
|
|-
|Loss
|align=center|26–12
|Dan Moret
|KO (punches)
|UAE Warriors 9
|
|align=center|2
|align=center|4:59
|Abu Dhabi, United Arab Emirates
|
|-
|Loss
|align=center|26–11
|Valeriu Mircea
|TKO (punches)
|Cage 44
|
|align=center|2
|align=center|4:15
|Helsinki, Finland
|
|- 
|Win
|align=center|26–10
|Takasuke Kume
|TKO (punches)
|Pancrase 297
|
|align=center|2
|align=center|4:56
|Tokyo, Japan 
|
|-
|Win
|align=center|25–10
|Junior Maranhão
|Decision (unanimous)
|Cage 42
|
|align=center|3
|align=center|5:00
|Helsinki, Finland
|
|-
|Win
|align=center|24–10
|Tetsuya Yamada
|Decision (unanimous)
|Cage 38
|
|align=center|3
|align=center|5:00
|Helsinki, Finland
|
|-
|Loss
|align=center|23–10
|Felipe Silva
|TKO (punches)
|Cage 35
|
|align=center|1
|align=center|4:04
|Helsinki, Finland
|
|-
|Loss
|align=center|23–9
|Thibault Gouti
|KO (punch)
|Cage 33
|
|align=center|3
|align=center|1:08
|Helsinki, Finland
|
|-
|Win
|align=center|23–8
|Eric Reynolds
|Decision (unanimous)
|Cage 31
|
|align=center|3
|align=center|5:00
|Helsinki, Finland
|
|-
|Win
|align=center|22–8
|Sean Carter
|Decision (unanimous)
|Cage 30
|
|align=center|3
|align=center|5:00
|Helsinki, Finland
|
|-
|Win
|align=center|21–8
|Sergej Grecicho
|Decision (unanimous)
|Cage 29
|
|align=center|3
|align=center|5:00
|Helsinki, Finland
|
|-
|Loss
|align=center|20–8
|Dakota Cochrane
|KO (flying knee)
|Fight Night Finland: Cochrane vs Kuivanen
|
|align=center|1
|align=center|0:48
|Helsinki, Finland
|
|-
|Win
|align=center|20–7
|Oriol Gaset
|TKO (knee to the body)
|Grand Combat Entertainment: Seven Virtues of Bushido
|
|align=center|1
|align=center|1:03
|Salo, Finland
|
|-
|Win
|align=center|19–7
|Diego Gonzalez
|KO (punches)
|Superior Challenge 9
|
|align=center|1
|align=center|0:52
|Gothenburg, Sweden
|
|-
|Loss
|align=center|18–7
|Eric Reynolds
|KO (punches)
|Cage 23
|
|align=center|1
|align=center|0:30
|Vantaa, Finland
|
|-
|Win
|align=center|18–6
|Jason Pierce
|Decision (unanimous)
|Cage 22
|
|align=center|3
|align=center|5:00
|Vantaa, Finland
|
|-
|Loss
|align=center|17–6
|Michael Chiesa
|Submission (rear naked choke)
|UFC 157
|
|align=center|2
|align=center|2:29
|Anaheim, California, United States
|
|-
|Win
|align=center|17–5
|Mitch Clarke
|Decision (split)
|UFC 149
|
|align=center|3
|align=center|5:00
|Calgary, Alberta, Canada
|
|-
|Loss
|align=center|16–5
|Justin Salas
|Decision (unanimous)
|UFC on Fuel TV: Sanchez vs. Ellenberger
|
|align=center|3
|align=center|5:00
|Omaha, Nebraska, United States
|
|-
|Win
|align=center|16–4
|Thiago Meller
|Decision (unanimous)
|Cage 16 - 1st Defense
|
|align=center|3
|align=center|5:00
|Espoo, Finland
|
|-
|Win
|align=center|15–4
|Ivan Buchinger
|Decision (unanimous)
|Cage 15 - Powered by Reezig
|
|align=center|3
|align=center|5:00
|Espoo, Finland
|
|-
|Win
|align=center|14–4
|Ryan Bixler
|Submission (rear naked choke)
|FF 29 - Fight Festival 29
|
|align=center|2
|align=center|4:51
|Helsinki, Finland
|
|-
|Win
|align=center|13–4
|Tim Radcliffe
|TKO (injury)
|Cage 14 - All Stars
|
|align=center|1
|align=center|5:00
|Espoo, Finland
|
|-
|Win
|align=center|12–4
|Raymond Jarman
|TKO (knee to the body)
|Cage 13 - Spring Break
|
|align=center|3
|align=center|4:00
|Vantaa, Finland
|
|-
|Win
|align=center|11–4
|Erikas Petraitis
|Decision (unanimous)
|FF 26 - Fight Festival 26
|
|align=center|3
|align=center|5:00
|Helsinki, Finland
|
|-
|Win
|align=center|10–4
|Yunus Evloev
|Submission (armbar)
|Lappeenranta Fight Night 3
|
|align=center|1
|align=center|1:22
|Lappeenranta, Finland
|
|-
|Win
|align=center|9–4
|Alexandre Abin
|TKO (punches)
|FF 25 - Fight Festival 25
|
|align=center|1
|align=center|2:30
|Helsinki, Finland
|
|-
|Win
|align=center|8–4
|Owen Hartwig
|Submission (armbar)
|AF 2 - Arctic Fights 2
|
|align=center|1
|align=center|2:27
|Rovaniemi, Finland
|
|-
|Loss
|align=center|7–4
|Bendy Casimir
|Submission (kneebar)
|HC 2 - Hell Cage 2
|
|align=center|1
|align=center|4:03
|Prague, Czech Republic
|
|-
|Win
|align=center|7–3
|Juris Karpenko
|Submission (armbar)
|FF 24 - Fight Festival 24
|
|align=center|1
|align=center|0:59
|Helsinki, Finland
|
|-
|Win
|align=center|6–3
|Vaclav Stastny
|Submission (armbar)
|CF 4 - Carelia Fight 4
|
|align=center|1
|align=center|1:51
|Imatra, Finland
|
|-
|Win
|align=center|5–3
|Sergei Kudrjashov
|Submission (arm triangle choke)
|The Cage Vol. 9 - Capital Concussion
|
|align=center|1
|align=center|1:23
|Helsinki, Finland
|
|-
|Loss
|align=center|4–3
|Sergej Juskevic
|TKO (punches)
|K-1 HERO's - HERO's Lithuania 2007
|
|align=center|2
|align=center|1:27
|Vilnius, Lithuania
|
|-
|Win
|align=center|4–2
|Takayuki Okochi
|TKO (punches)
|Shooto Estonia - Bushido
|
|align=center|1
|align=center|0:59
|Tallinn, Estonia
|
|-
|Loss
|align=center|3–2
|Marius Liaukevicius
|TKO (punches)
|K-1 - Hero's Lithuania
|
|align=center|2
|align=center|4:27
|Vilnius, Lithuania
|
|-
|Loss
|align=center|3–1
|Hiroki Kotani
|Submission (heel hook)
|Zst - Prestige
|
|align=center|1
|align=center|1:17
|Turku, Finland
|
|-
|Win
|align=center|3–0
|Cole Lauritsen
|Decision (unanimous)
|CF 2 - Carelia Fight 2
|
|align=center|3
|align=center|5:00
|Imatra, Finland
|
|-
|Win
|align=center|2–0
|Martin Ahlberg
|Submission (guillotine choke)
|The Cage Vol. 6 - Balls to the Wall
|
|align=center|1
|align=center|0:35
|Helsinki, Finland
|
|-
|Win
|align=center|1–0
|Sergey Denisov
|Submission (rear naked choke)
|EKH - MMA Action
|
|align=center|1
|align=center|1:48
|Espoo, Finland
|

References

External links
 Twitter
 Anton Kuivasen haastattelu 21.8.2012
 
 
 Official Website

Finnish male mixed martial artists
Lightweight mixed martial artists
Mixed martial artists utilizing capoeira
Mixed martial artists utilizing boxing
Mixed martial artists utilizing Muay Thai
Mixed martial artists utilizing wrestling
Mixed martial artists utilizing Brazilian jiu-jitsu
Finnish practitioners of Brazilian jiu-jitsu
Finnish capoeira practitioners
Finnish Muay Thai practitioners
Living people
1984 births
Estonian emigrants to Finland
Finnish people of Russian descent
Finnish people of Estonian descent
Finnish expatriate sportspeople in Thailand
Finnish expatriate sportspeople in the United States
Sportspeople from Helsinki
Ultimate Fighting Championship male fighters